Lightning Strikes Twice may refer to:

 Lightning Strikes Twice (album), 1989 album by Molly Hatchet
 Lightning Strikes Twice (1934 film), 1934 American film directed by Ben Holmes
 Lightning Strikes Twice (1951 film), a 1951 film drama